The Abierto de Puebla (previously known as the Challenger Varonil Britania Zavaleta) is a professional tennis tournament played on hard courts. It is currently part of the ATP Challenger Tour and the International Tennis Federation (ITF) Women's Circuit. It was held annually in Puebla, Mexico, from 1996 to 2009. The tournament was reinstated in 2016.

Past finals

Singles

Doubles

Women's singles

Women's doubles

External links
ITF search

ATP Challenger Tour
ITF Women's World Tennis Tour
Hard court tennis tournaments
Recurring sporting events established in 1996
Challenger Britania Zavaleta
Tennis tournaments in Mexico
Recurring sporting events disestablished in 2016
1996 establishments in Mexico
2016 disestablishments in Mexico